Nabil Daoudi is a Moroccan footballer born in 1983. He has played forward for Maghreb de Fès. He is also a Moroccan international. He has also played for Emirates.

References 

1983 births
Living people
Moroccan footballers
Emirates Club players
UAE First Division League players
UAE Pro League players
Expatriate footballers in the United Arab Emirates
Moroccan expatriate footballers
Dubai CSC players
Al-Ittihad Kalba SC players

Association footballers not categorized by position